"One More Light" is a song by American rock band Linkin Park. It is the ninth and title track from their seventh studio album of the same name, as well as their last major single with longtime lead vocalist Chester Bennington. The song was co-written with Eg White and was released to US contemporary hit radio on October 3, 2017, as the album's third and final single. It is Bennington's second posthumously released single. The song is a ballad.

The music video for this song was also voted number one in a poll of Fuse Top 40 Videos of 2017 and is also nominated for Best Rock Video at the 2018 MTV Video Music Awards.

Background
In late 2016, Shinoda revealed that he had worked with British songwriter Eg White on a song. In an interview leading up to the reveal of the album's lead single, "Heavy", Shinoda revealed that White had worked with him on the song "One More Light" while Brad Delson attended the funeral of one of the band's friends. When asked what he wanted to write about by White, Shinoda said that the only thing he could think about was the friend who had passed. He revealed that, in spite of the horrible inevitability of loss, the song is about letting people know that you care.

Later on the band revealed the friend was Amy Zaret, a 25-year veteran of Warner Bros. Records who died in October 2015 following a cancer diagnosis. Shinoda said, {{cquote|We had a friend who worked for the record label for a long time and came up with us from years and years ago. She started out in radio promo and was basically driving us to the local radio stations in the U.S. Midwest, eventually getting promoted and promoted. At some point last year, I suddenly heard that she'd got cancer - and then all of a sudden she had died. We knew we absolutely had to write about what happened. It's a sad song, but the pay-off is that when something dramatic and painful like that happens, the most important thing to do is to connect with the people you love and remind them you care about them."|}}

The band surprised some of the people who worked at Warner with the song, and people reacted very emotionally to it, with some weeping, giving hugs, and telling stories. They played the song on Jimmy Kimmel Live!'' and dedicated it to their late friend Chris Cornell, who had died a day before.

After lead singer Chester Bennington's suicide on July 20, 2017, the band selected "One More Light" as their next single. Shinoda wrote "One More Light was written with the intention of sending love to those who lost someone. We now find ourselves on the receiving end. In memorial events, art, videos, and images, fans all over the world have gravitated towards this song as their declaration of love and support for the band and the memory of our dear friend, Chester. We are so very grateful and can’t wait to see you again."

On October 25, 2017, American DJ/Producer and Linkin Park collaborator Steve Aoki released his remix of "One More Light", as his second tribute song to Bennington following his mashup, "Darker Than The Light That Never Bleeds", which was released a month earlier.

Music video
The official video was uploaded to Linkin Park's YouTube channel on September 18, 2017, and directed by Joe Hahn and Mark Fiore. It features footage of Chester performing in the middle of fans, footage of him at live shows such as Live in Texas and Road to Revolution: Live at Milton Keynes, and past music videos for their past singles "Burn It Down", "Waiting for the End" and "Powerless", as well as the band themselves through the years. On making the music video, Hahn said: 
  
Upon its release, the video racked up 3 million views on YouTube in the first 24 hours.

As of February 2023, the music video for "One More Light" has over 250 million views on YouTube.

Lyric video 
On October 3, 2017, Linkin Park uploaded an official lyric video to YouTube. This video was created by Nicola Drilling and fans of Linkin Park from around the world. As of November 7, 2021, the lyric video has more than 7.2 million views on YouTube.

Personnel
Band
 Chester Bennington – lead vocals
 Brad Delson – guitars, production
 Dave "Phoenix" Farrell – bass guitar
 Mr. Hahn – samples, programming
 Mike Shinoda – backing vocals, keyboards, production

Additional musicians
 Guitar and piano by Eg White

Production
 Written by Mike Shinoda and Francis White
 Produced by Mike Shinoda and Brad Delson
 Vocal production by Emily Wright
 Music performed by Linkin Park
 Vocals by Chester Bennington and Mike Shinoda
 Chester's vocals recorded at The Pool Recording Studio, London, UK
 Mike's vocals recorded at The Warehouse Studio, Vancouver, British Columbia, Canada
 Music recorded at Larrabee Studios, North Hollywood, CA and Sphere Studios, North Hollywood, CA
 Engineered by Ethan Mates, Mike Shinoda and Josh Newell
 Assistant engineer: Alejandro Baima
 Studio B assistant engineer: Warren Willis
 Studio drum tech: Jerry Johnson
 Mixed by Manny Marroquin at Larrabee Studios, North Hollywood, CA
 Mix engineer: Chris Galland assisted by Jeff Jackson and Robin Florent

Charts

Weekly charts

Year-end charts

Certifications

Release history

References

External links
 

2017 songs
Linkin Park songs
2010s ballads
Commemoration songs
Songs written by Mike Shinoda
Songs written by Eg White
2017 singles
Rock ballads
Warner Records singles
Electronic rock songs